Eric Nunez (born April 9, 1982)  is a former American professional tennis player. In his career he has won four doubles Challenger titles. He is married and has two children.

ATP Challenger and ITF Futures finals

Singles: 7 (4–3)

Doubles: 17 (6–11)

References

External links
 
 

1982 births
Living people
American male tennis players
Sportspeople from St. Petersburg, Florida
Tennis people from Florida
People from Aventura, Florida